The Baltic Journal of Art History is a biannual peer-reviewed academic journal covering art history of the Baltic countries. It is published by the University of Tartu Press on behalf of the Institute of History and Archeology (University of Tartu) and the editor-in-chief is Kadri Asmer (University of Tartu). It was established in 2009 and publishes articles in English, Estonian, and German.

Abstracting and indexing
The journal is abstracted and indexed in the Emerging Sources Citation Index and Scopus.

References

External links

Publications established in 2009
Art history journals
Multilingual journals
English-language journals
Estonian-language journals
German-language journals
Biannual journals
University of Tartu